The Busan Al-Fatah Mosque is a mosque in Namsan-dong, Geumjeong District, Busan, South Korea.

History
The mosque was established in 1980 with donation from Libya.

Architecture
The mosque is a white building structure with Middle East architectural style. It also features a library.

Transportation
The mosque is accessible within walking distance north of Dusil Station of Busan Metro.

See also
 Islam in Korea

References

1980 establishments in South Korea
Mosques completed in 1980
Mosques in South Korea
Religious buildings and structures in Busan
Mosque buildings with domes
Sunni Islam in Asia
Sunni mosques
20th-century architecture in South Korea